2014 Desafio Internacional das Estrelas was the ninth edition of Desafio Internacional das Estrelas (International Challenge of the Stars), the races scheduled for 10–12 January 2014 at Kartódromo do Beto Carrero World at Penha, Santa Catarina, Brazil.

Participants
Provisional entry list. Full grid is 26 units.

Classification

Qualifying

References

External links
  

Desafio Internacional das Estrelas
Desafio Internacional das Estrelas